Korn (printed and stylized as KoЯn) is the debut studio album by American nu metal band Korn. It was released on October 11, 1994, through Immortal/Epic Records. Before recording the album, the band was approached by Immortal/Epic Records after a performance at Huntington Beach, California. The band signed to their label because they did not want to "sign away all of their creative freedom". The band would record at Indigo Ranch Studios in Malibu, California, with producer Ross Robinson, who also produced their 1993 demo Neidermayer's Mind. The recording took place from May to June 1994. After the recordings, Korn toured with Biohazard and House of Pain.

The album's themes include child abuse, drug abuse, and bullying. The album cover depicts a young girl being approached by a large man who is holding what appears to be horseshoes or possibly blades. Furthermore, the girl's shadow gives the appearance that her body is being hanged due to the position of the band's logo. Photography was done by Stephen Stickler, and the design was directed by Jay Papke and Dante Ariola.

The first single, "Blind", charted at number 15 on the Canadian Alternative 30, and the album peaked at number 10 in New Zealand as well as number 72 on the Billboard 200. The debut album has sold at least 2.1 million copies in the United States and 10 million copies worldwide, according to Nielsen SoundScan as of January 4, 2013. The album is considered by many to have started the nu metal genre.

Korn toured with many bands to promote the album. Initially, Korn joined the Sick of It All Tour. Following the Sick of It All Tour, Korn joined the Danzig 4 Tour. Korn also toured with Megadeth, Fear Factory, and Flotsam and Jetsam.

Background 
Before Korn developed a name, they had moved into a small house together in Huntington Beach, California, south of Los Angeles, where they began working on songs. Soon after moving, they rented Underground Chicken Sounds, a recording studio, from Jeff Creath, who had previously allowed lead singer Jonathan Davis to live in his garage. While they were recording at the studio, they attracted a crowd of people when performing the prelude to "Clown". The band's bass guitarist, Reginald "Fieldy" Arvizu, said that the crowd gathered because the band's style sounded so "different".

Korn was formed in 1993. Within two weeks of their establishment, they recorded a demo containing "Blind", "Predictable", and "Daddy". A couple of weeks later, Korn played their first-ever show at a club called California Dreams in Anaheim. Korn began playing gigs in the summer of 1993. While performing at Huntington Beach, the band was spotted by Immortal/Epic A&R Paul Pontius. He approached the band offering to record an album through their company. Although the group had offers from several other labels, Korn went with Immortal/Epic because they did not want to "sign away all of their creative freedom".

Recording and production 

While Korn was looking for a place to record their debut album, they asked producer Ross Robinson to produce their album. After accepting the offer, Robinson suggested they record at Indigo Ranch, Malibu, California. The band would record the majority of the album there, while additional recording took place at Bakersfield's Fat Tracks. Korn recorded most of the album with all members playing simultaneously, as opposed to recording instruments separately. In addition, Indigo Ranch was located on a hill rather than in the city, allowing them to record outside, resulting in the "distinctive" sound and quality of music given off by their instruments. The banging sound near the ending of "Ball Tongue" was created via a guitar cord striking a music stand. The bagpipes on "Shoots and Ladders" are often thought to have been recorded on a mountain-top. However, they were actually recorded with a microphone set up at the back door of the studio while Jonathan Davis walked past outside playing. As he walked further from the microphone, this led to the sound naturally fading quieter. Davis said that "Daddy" features him singing the song alone in the dark without knowing that his vocals were being recorded. Korn finished recording their self-titled album by the end of June 1994.

Since Robinson produced the album, his career was launched by its success, as it "taught Robinson how to produce." In an interview with the heavy metal magazine Metal Hammer, Davis touted Robinson's behavior, saying: "Ross is a very pure and clean-spirited person, and you feel it when you're with him. He's the kind of person that can draw that out of you. I felt very safe with Ross." The album was released on October 11, 1994, through Immortal and Epic Records. During the recording of Korn, there were four outtakes: "Christmas Song", "Sean Olson", "Layla", and "This Broken Soul". "Sean Olson" was put on the single release of "Shoots and Ladders", and featured on The Crow: City of Angels soundtrack.

In 2015, Davis ranked the 1994 debut album as his favorite Korn album.

Composition and lyrics 
Korn begins with "Blind", starting with the dueling riffs of James Shaffer and Brian Welch. Lead vocalist Jonathan Davis' first line is "Are you ready?!", which is now one of the band's trademarks. Davis told Metal Hammer that on the album's second track, "Ball Tongue", he "didn't sing a goddamn word in that song. I couldn't describe what I wanted to do, so that's how it came out. It's a really heavy sound." "Shoots and Ladders" explores the concept of nursery rhymes. Davis relates: "'Shoots and Ladders' uncovers the hidden messages in nursery rhymes, the first songs many of us ever hear. 'Shoots and Ladders', to set the record straight, calls out nursery rhymes for what they really are. I choose each rhyme for a different reason—'Baa Baa Black Sheep' has racist overtones. 'London Bridge' talks of all the people of London dying (from the Black Plague, as does 'Ring Around the Roses'). Then there's 'Little Red Riding Hood'—one story tells of the wolf raping Red Riding Hood and killing her."

"Clown"'s concept deals with an incident that happened in San Diego, California. A skinhead who told Davis to "go back to Bakersfield" attempted to hit Davis but he dodged and the band's road manager, Jeff, knocked the skinhead out. "Helmet in the Bush" was about Davis' drug abuse, and the fear that gripped him at the height of his drug problem. He pleaded for a divine intervention to deliver him from his nightmare. Davis explained: "I'd wake up in the morning and do a line to get out of bed. Speed (methamphetamine) in the morning, I'd have it all lined up for breakfast so when I'd lay down and go to sleep, I'd wake up and just snort and it's like 'Yeah, okay, I'm up. ' It was bad. It's like, you do one line and stay up all night, but then you have shit to do the next day so you have to do another line to be able to keep staying up to get that shit done. Eventually you start spinning-out from sleep deprivation. You get hallucinations and shit like that." Davis said that "Helmet in the Bush" "is about meth. It's about when you do meth and you look down at your dick and it's literally a helmet in the bush [laughs]". "Basically it's what happens when you do too much drugs and your girl wanna get with you and you got some man problems down below. Just another reason not to do drugs, children," Munky elaborated.

"Faget" lyrical themes are about lead vocalist Jonathan Davis' time in high school where he was relentlessly bullied primarily by jocks for wearing eyeliner, listening to new wave and enjoying arts. He was constantly called names like "fag" or "faggot". Davis talked about the song in an interview saying, 

"Daddy", the album's longest track, saw Jonathan Davis "descending very real tears." Davis said that the song's concept deals with his childhood, saying "People think 'Daddy' was written because my father abused me, but that's not what the song's about. When I was a kid, I was being abused by someone else. I don't really like to talk about that song." Though the song ends at 9:32, a hidden track which depicts an argument between a man and his wife over a Dodge Dart carburetor can be heard at 14:05 after about 4.5 minutes of silence.

According to Jonathan Davis and Brian Welch, current Metallica and then-Suicidal Tendencies bassist Robert Trujillo helped them write the song "Divine."

Marketing and promotion 
Stephen Stickler acted as the band's photographer, and Jay Papke and Dante Ariola directed the album's cover art and booklet. The cover depicts Paul Pontius' niece in a blue school uniform with a matching bow in her blonde hair, bringing her swing to a stop to squint in the sun at the man standing before her. The man is only seen as a dark shadow on the ground, and is holding what appears to be a horse shoe or, more presumably, blades. The band's logo, a childlike drawing of the band's name created by lead singer Jonathan Davis, is seen on the sandy ground by the man.  The back cover of the album compliments the front, showing the empty playground.

After Korn finished recording the album, they began touring with Biohazard and House of Pain at free gigs. Korn personally passed out flyers at their performances. Their record company gave them enough money for their own tour bus. Korn's first gig was in Atlanta, Georgia. About halfway through the tour, the tour bus that their record company gave them stopped working, forcing the band to find a new one. This first tour proved very unsuccessful in promoting the album. Aside from them touring, Korn released four singles. "Blind" was the lead single, released in 1994, followed by "Need To", "Shoots and Ladders", and "Clown".

Despite this, Korn resumed touring in the Sick of It All Tour, beginning on January 21, 1995, and ending in March 1995. Following the Sick of It All Tour, Korn joined the Danzig 4 Tour, including Danzig and Marilyn Manson. The tour lasted three months and was preceded with the group touring with Megadeth, where they played to crowds of thirty-five-hundred to five thousand. They toured with Megadeth, Fear Factory, and Flotsam and Jetsam. All of this happened in the summer of 1995. Lead vocalist Jonathan Davis introduced the bagpipes while performing live (however many people there did not like this).

Korn began touring in Europe during September 1995. One of the band's first concert dates was in Nottingham. After the performance, there was a conflict between Arvizu and the drum technician, resulting in the airport prohibiting them from boarding the plane. Korn made their London debut on October 27, 1995, performing at LA2 with Paw as the opening act. At the end of that same month, the band also made their Paris debut playing in a small club, L'Araphao. Korn received positive praise from the European press because of their "ravaging" live performances. By October 1995, Korn had played 200–250 dates in support of their first album. From 1995 to 1996, Korn toured with Sugar Ray, Cradle of Thorns, Life of Agony, and others. Korn and Deftones opened for Ozzy Osbourne in early 1996.

Critical reception

Korn was well received by music critics. Stephen Thomas Erlewine of AllMusic gave Korn a positive review, calling the album "a powerful sound and one that actually builds on the funk-metal innovations of the late '80s/early '90s instead of merely replicating them". In their original 1994 review, the Los Angeles Times wrote "Kindred to such bands as Tool, Rollins Band and Rage Against the Machine, Korn and its singer-lyricist, Jonathan Davis, make their core ethic fairly explicit in songs like "Predictable", "Lies" and "Fake": the world is a torment-filled morass that leaves us seething with deep, internalized fears; virtue lies in confronting those painful truths unflinchingly and screaming them to the world." In his 1995 review, Jason Arnopp of Kerrang! wrote that Davis' "voice overflows with cracked, frustrated emotion, often lapsing into uncontrollable screams like a mental ward". He described how Korn have "injected their own special insanity into the music, crafting a horribly sleazy sound that matches their bleak outlook on life". He noted that the "general aggression" of the album could delight fans of Prong, Pantera, and Rage Against the Machine. Arnopp rated Korn 4 out of 5 and mentioned the "band's cult stature" a year after the album's release. In 1996, music journalist Manuel Rabasse described Korn as "an almost dadaist record – little or no melody, structures cut out in spite of common sense, guitars deliberately out of tune – with, to top it all off, a hysterical vocalist playing the bagpipes" and said Korn was "a group of crazies". Rabasse found the album "marks the awakening of a metal-hardcore a little too primal".

Sputnikmusic thought that although Davis isn't the best lyricist, he is able to paint very disturbing visual images in the head of the listener, especially on the song "Daddy". Sputnikmusic also thought that Davis's voice was what made Korn unique, and that it made every song on the album interesting. They praised each of the members' skill on their respective instrument, and summed it up as "a bass heavy, angst ridden vessel of catharsis". They considered "Blind", "Ball Tongue", "Need To", "Faget", "Helmet in the Bush" and "Daddy" to be the best songs from the album. Arnopp stated that the group "positively encouraged America's formerly introverted, apathetic misfits to thrust a livid middle finger in the face of high–school jocks who would traditionally bundle them into a locker and brand them 'faggots' for sporting hair longer than any Army buzz-cut."

Reappraisal
In a 2002 critical reappraisal, Catherine Yates of Kerrang! gave the album  5 out of 5 rating. She compared it against "the continuing glut of interchangeable metal drones who have appropriated their blueprint for quick sell, lowest common denominator, and it still stands as a monument – unchallenged and unequaled – to the authentic ideals that spawned it". In 2022, Metal Hammer writers wrote that they considered the album to be Korn's best, writing, "this is a record that remains as integral to modern metal as the first Black Sabbath album or Metallica's Master of Puppets.

Commercial performance
On January 29, 1996, Korn went gold in the United States, and on February 10, 1996, the album charted at number 72. The album spent 30 weeks on the Recording Industry Association of New Zealand charts, entering on June 23, 1996, and peaking at number 10. The album left the chart on May 18, 1997. It went platinum in the United States on January 8, 1997, and entered the ARIA Charts on March 28, 1999, at number 49. It maintained a position on the chart for five weeks, and peaked at number 46. It peaked at number five on the Top Pop Catalog Albums chart on April 24, 1999. On July 17, 1999, it entered the MegaCharts at its peak position of 56. After three weeks, Korn left the chart. On November 10, 1999, it was certified double-platinum by the Recording Industry Association of America. The album peaked at number 181 on the UK Albums Chart on February 10, 2001. It has been certified platinum by the Australian Recording Industry Association. In 2003, Billboard reported that Korn sold at least 2,100,000 copies in the United States.

Legacy and influence
Korn's debut album is said to have established nu metal. As said by Joel McIver, Korn "was almost solely responsible for the tidal wave of change that subsequently swept the metal scene." Bands like Coal Chamber and Limp Bizkit were inspired by the album's "churning rage, emphasising similar grooves and song structures", and "the sound's hip-hop elements". Slipknot, Machine Head, and Sepultura were also inspired by the album. The album launched the career of record producer Ross Robinson, who later produced albums such as Sepultura's 1996 album Roots, Limp Bizkit's 1997 debut album Three Dollar Bill, Y'all, and Slipknot's first two albums (their 1999 self-titled debut and 2001's Iowa).

In 2014, Rolling Stone described Korn as "the most important metal record of the last 20 years". In July 2014, Guitar World ranked Korn at number 27 in their "Superunknown: 50 Iconic Albums That Defined 1994" list. In 2018, Loudwire named it the greatest nu metal album of all-time. In 2017, Rolling Stone listed the album at No. 30 on its list of the 100 Greatest Metal Albums of All Time.

Catherine Yates of Kerrang! compared the album's impact to that of Nirvana, stating that Nirvana "provided the soundtrack to the trials of disaffected youth", while Korn's debut album "was the manifestation of disaffected youth itself", summarizing that "Korn itself was the forebear of a musical movement". Metal Hammer highlighted Korns influence as having spawned "A parade of copycats and bandwagon-hoppers who took the album's sound and remodelled it without an ounce of innovation that Korn possessed".

Track listing 
All tracks written by Korn, except "Daddy" and "Blind", written by Korn, Dennis Shinn, and Ryan Shuck.

 "Daddy" ends at 9:32. A hidden track, "Michael & Geri", starts at 14:05, after four minutes and 33 seconds of silence. (however, on some versions of the album "Michael & Geri" is a separate track from "Daddy" and lasts 3:26).

Personnel 
Korn
 Jonathan Davis – vocals, bagpipes
 Head – guitar, background vocals
 Munky – guitar
 Fieldy – bass
 David Silveria – drums

Additional personnel
 Judith Kiener – vocals on the lullaby at the end of "Daddy"
 Richard Kaplan – engineer
 Chuck Johnson – engineer, mixing
 Ross Robinson – producer, engineer, mixing
 Eddy Schreyer – mastering
 Stephen Stickler – photography
 Jay Papke/Dante Ariola – art direction and design

Charts

Weekly charts

Year-end charts

Singles

Certifications

References

Sources

Bibliography

External links
 

1994 debut albums
Albums produced by Ross Robinson
Epic Records albums
Immortal Records albums
Korn albums
Nu metal albums by American artists